Stanley Robert Kelley (14 June 1920 – 1993) was an English footballer who played as a left-back for Coventry City.

Career
Kelley played for Herberts Athletic and Coventry City. He played one game as a guest for Port Vale during World War II in a 1–0 win over Walsall at the Old Recreation Ground on 19 January 1946.

Career statistics
Source:

References

1920 births
1993 deaths
Footballers from Coventry
English footballers
Association football fullbacks
Coventry City F.C. players
Port Vale F.C. wartime guest players
English Football League players